Langa is a Bantu language of Maniema Province, Democratic Republic of the Congo.

References

Tetela languages